Nabesna Glacier is a glacier in the U.S. state of Alaska. Fed by deep snowfall in the Wrangell Mountains, the 53 mile (85 km) long  Nabesna is the longest valley glacier in North America and the world's longest interior valley glacier.

The glacier flows from an extensive icefield which covers the northern flanks of  Mount Wrangell, a large shield volcano. The vast expanse and length of the Nabesna is fed by approximately 40 tributary glaciers. Melting ice at its terminus forms the Nabesna River, which flows northward through Tetlin National Wildlife Refuge and into the Tanana River.

Geography 
The glacier was named for the Nabesna River in 1902 by F. C. Schrader of the U.S. Geological Survey. It provides the normal route of access into the heart of the eastern Wrangell Mountains, for ski mountaineers, climbers, and scientists. Ski-equipped bush planes can typically land between 6,000 and 7,000 ft (1,800-2,100 m) on the central portion of the glacier when the ice and crevasses are covered by winter snow.

The glacier has been undergoing a slow, near-continuous retreat since at least the early 1900s. There is evidence to indicate that this retreat may have been going on even longer than that, as glacial deposits much farther down the valley indicate that it may have once been over 200 miles long.

References

See also
 List of glaciers

Glaciers of Alaska
Glaciers of Copper River Census Area, Alaska
Glaciers of Unorganized Borough, Alaska
Wrangell–St. Elias National Park and Preserve